WJBL (93.1 FM; "93.1 The Cabin") is a radio station  broadcasting a classic hits format. Licensed to Ladysmith, Wisconsin, United States, the station is owned by Michael Oberg and George Manus, through licensee Zoe Communications Co., Inc. It features programming from Westwood One and Salem Radio Network.

The station is a three-man team including local broadcaster Bob Krejcarek (KREO), Rolling with Amanda in the morning and Station Manager Chris Brooks on Two Hour Energy in the afternoons.  Public contributions include the Swapline program in the mornings from 6:45 to 7:00, and the Afternoon Swap from 12:45 to 1:00.

History
The station was assigned the call letters WLDY-FM on February 14, 1983. On September 10, 1993, it changed its call sign to the current WJBL.

References

External links

JBL
Classic hits radio stations in the United States